The Historic Churches of Canon Historic District in Canon, Georgia is a historic district,  in size, which was listed on the National Register of Historic Places in 1985.  The listing included three contributing buildings.

It covers three wood-framed churches: Canon Baptist Church, Canon Universalist Church, and Canon Methodist Church.

See also
Canon Commercial Historic District

References

Historic districts on the National Register of Historic Places in Georgia (U.S. state)
National Register of Historic Places in Franklin County, Georgia
Gothic Revival architecture in Georgia (U.S. state)
Churches on the National Register of Historic Places in Georgia (U.S. state)